The 1991–92 ADT Security Systems Rugby Union County Championship was the 92nd edition of England's County Championship rugby union club competition. 

Lancashire won their 15th title after defeating Cornwall in the final.

Final

See also
 English rugby union system
 Rugby union in England

References

Rugby Union County Championship
County Championship (rugby union) seasons